The King George Hall (KGH) of the University of Colombo in Colombo is one of the oldest theatres of Sri Lanka. Built the mid-1920s following the establishment of the University College Colombo it was meant function as a theater, lecture hall and venue for many university functions, a purpose it serves to this day.

References

Itipahan (Burly Lamp) Chapter - 14 
Maname: Continuation of the same production
Earle de Fonseka (Professor T E G de Fonseka)

Theatres in Colombo District
Cultural buildings in Colombo
University of Colombo
British colonial architecture in Sri Lanka